Nelliady Central College ( Nelliyaṭi Mattiya kalloori, also known as Nelliady Madhya Maha Vidyalayam) is a national school in Nelliady, Sri Lanka.

History

The school was founded in 1921. It was promoted to Madhya Maha Vidyalayam status in 1946. The school, like most schools in the north and east of Sri Lanka, was severely affected by the Sri Lankan Civil War. The school was the site of Sri Lanka's first suicide attack on 5 July 1987 when Captain Miller drove a small truck laden with explosives into the Sri Lankan Army camp at the school.

See also
 List of schools in Northern Province, Sri Lanka

References

External links
 Nelliady Madhya Maha Vidyalayam
 Nelliady Madhya Maha Vidyalayam
 Old Students' Association, Canada

Educational institutions established in 1921
Provincial schools in Sri Lanka
Schools in Jaffna District
1921 establishments in Ceylon